Soløyvatnet is a lake that lies in the municipality of Bodø in Nordland county, Norway.

See also
 List of lakes in Norway
 Geography of Norway

References

Lakes of Nordland
Bodø